Aphaiphubet is a Thai noble title granted to some governors of Battambang, who acted as rulers of western Cambodia during the period of Siamese rule from 1794 to 1907. Past titleholders all came from what is now the Abhaiwongse family.

Holders of the title included:
 Chaophraya Aphaiphubet (Baen)
 Phraya Aphaiphubet (Baen)
 
 Phraya Aphaiphubet (Ched)
 Phraya Aphaiphubet (Som)
 Phraya Aphaiphubet (Nong)
 
 

Thai titles of nobility
Noble titles created in 1794
Aphaiphubet